Ronald Hamming (born January 9, 1973, in Zeegse, Drenthe) is a football striker from the Netherlands, who played for BV Veendam from summer 2003 in the Dutch second league, Eerste Divisie. He previously played for FC Groningen (1992–1994) and Fortuna Sittard (1994–2003), for which he scored 99 goals in nine seasons.

External links
  Profile

1973 births
Living people
People from Tynaarlo
Dutch footballers
Association football forwards
FC Groningen players
Fortuna Sittard players
SC Veendam players
Eredivisie players
Eerste Divisie players
Footballers from Drenthe